Rafael Alexandre Bandeira Fonseca (born 31 January 2001) is a Portuguese professional footballer who plays as a defender for Académico de Viseu.

Football career
He made his Serie C debut for Juventus U23 on 15 September 2019 in a game against Pro Patria.

References

External links

Living people
2001 births
Sportspeople from Almada
Portuguese footballers
Association football defenders
Juventus Next Gen players
Amiens SC players
Académico de Viseu F.C. players
Serie C players
Championnat National 3 players
Ligue 2 players
Portuguese expatriate footballers
Portuguese expatriate sportspeople in Italy
Expatriate footballers in Italy
Portuguese expatriate sportspeople in France
Expatriate footballers in France